John Balossi (May 28, 1931 – April 8, 2007) was a painter and sculptor.  Born in New York City, he received his BFA and master's degree at Columbia University in N.Y.C. He was an associate Professor of Fine Arts at the University of Puerto Rico in Río Piedras.

Balossi was also a ceramist and printmaker, and gave more than thirty one-man exhibitions in Puerto Rico, New York, and Paris, France. In his thematic, he was well known for his interpretations of horses. Remarkable were some of his woodcuts such as the series "White Rider" and the enormous "Moonscape" (on discarded paper) unfortunately lost.

His work can be found in the Museum of Modern Art (N.Y.); Finch College Museum (N.Y.); Museum of Fine Arts (Fort Lauderdale); Chase Manhattan Fine Arts Center; University of Massachusetts Amherst; Ponce Art Museum; and in many other public and private art collections.

Museum Collections
Museum of Modern Art, New York
Finch College Museum, New York
Museum of Fine Arts, Fort Lauderdale
Chase Manhattan Collection, New York
Ponce Art Museum, Ponce
Fine Arts Center, University of Massachusetts, Amherst
Drew University, Madison, New Jersey
Museo Rodante, Department of Education, Hatio Rey
University of Puerto Rico Museum, Rio Piedras
Museo de Puerto Rico, San Juan
Library of Congress, Washington D.C.
 Maria Elena Vila Collection, P.R.
 Dr. Briseida Feliciano Collection, Caguas P.R.
 Estate of Denise Sigaud,Paris, France
 Connie Hamilton Collection, New York, N.Y. USA
 Piero Sanavio Collection, Paris, France and Rome, Italy.

See also 
 List of Italian Americans

References 
https://www.mapr.org/en/museum/proa/artist/balossi-john

https://web.archive.org/web/20110715131432/http://www.puertoricanart-crafts.com/pages/page32.htm

 

20th-century Italian painters
Italian male painters
21st-century Italian painters
Modern painters
20th-century American painters
American male painters
21st-century American painters
21st-century American male artists
1931 births
2007 deaths
20th-century American male artists
20th-century Italian male artists
21st-century Italian male artists